The Nederlandse Handbal Eredivisie Dames is the highest category in the national league system for women's handball's clubs in the Netherlands. Swift Roermond is the competition's most successful team with nineteen titles, while VOC Amsterdam is the defending champion.

List of champions 

 1954 UDI 1896 Arnhem
 1955 Hellas Den Haag
 1956 NILOC Amsterdam
 1957 Hellas Den Haag
 1958 NILOC Amsterdam
 1959 Zeeburg
 1960 Zeeburg
 1961 WLC Eindhoven
 1962 NILOC Amsterdam
 1963 Swift Roermond
 1964 Swift Roermond
 1965 Swift Roermond
 1966 Swift Roermond
 1967 Swift Roermond
 1968 NILOC Amsterdam
 1969 Swift Roermond
 1970 Swift Roermond
 1971 NILOC Amsterdam
 1972 NILOC Amsterdam
 1973 Swift Roermond

 1974 Swift Roermond
 1975 Swift Roermond
 1976 Hellas Den Haag
 1977 Hellas Den Haag
 1978 Hellas Den Haag
 1979 Swift Roermond
 1980 Hellas Den Haag
 1981 Hellas Den Haag
 1982 Swift Roermond
 1983 NILOC Amsterdam
 1984 NILOC Amsterdam
 1985 Ookmeer Amsterdam
 1986 Ookmeer Amsterdam
 1987 V&L Geleen
 1988 Westfriesland SEW
 1989 Westfriesland SEW
 1990 V&L Geleen
 1991 HV Aalsmeer
 1992 Swift Roermond
 1993 Swift Roermond

 1994 Swift Roermond 
 1995 Swift Roermond
 1996 Swift Roermond
 1997 Swift Roermond 
 1998 Swift Roermond
 1999 Westfriesland SEW
 2000 VOC Amsterdam
 2001 Westfriesland SEW
 2002 Hellas Den Haag
 2003 Westfriesland SEW
 2004 Westfriesland SEW
 2005 Hellas Den Haag
 2006 Van der Voort/Quintus
 2007 Van der Voort/Quintus
 2008 VOC Amsterdam
 2009 VOC Amsterdam
 2010 VOC Amsterdam
 2011 SV Dalfsen
 2012 SV Dalfsen
 2013 SV Dalfsen

 2014 SV Dalfsen
 2015 SV Dalfsen
 2016 SV Dalfsen
 2017 VOC Amsterdam
 2018 VOC Amsterdam
 2019 VOC Amsterdam
 2020 No champions
 2021 No champions
 2022 HandbaL Venlo

References

Women's handball leagues
Handball in the Netherlands
Women's handball in the Netherlands
Women's sports leagues in the Netherlands
Professional sports leagues in the Netherlands